The BRT Kuching is a proposed bus rapid transit (BRT) project to improve bus services in the city of Kuching. In 2011, it was reported the project will be start on 2012, but still no green lights from the government for making such project. At the end of 2015, the 2016 Malaysian Budget channelling MYR1 billion to build Kota Kinabalu bus rapid transit system first before focusing the project in Kuching.

References

External links 
 Map of the proposed BRT Lines of Kuching Economic Planning Unit, Malaysia (pp. 13/16) (archive link)

Proposed transport infrastructure in Malaysia
Bus rapid transit
Bus transport in Malaysia
Transport in Sarawak